The Santo Antão North Super Cup . (Portuguese:  Super Taça de Santo Antão Norte, ALUPEK: Super Taça di Santu Anton du Norti) is a regional super cup competition played during the season in the north of Santo Antão Island, Cape Verde consisting the municipalities of Paul and Ribeira Grande. Sometimes known as the Ribeira Grande Super Cup, that name is no longer commonly used today. The super cup competition is organized by the Santo Antão North Regional Football Association (Associação Regional de Futebol de Santo Antão Norte, ARFSAN). Since 2015, the winner competes in to Santo Antão Super Cup right after.  Its current winner is Rosariense Clube who won their only super cup title.

Winners

1Runner-up in the cup competition as the season's champion was also a cup winner

See also
Santo Antão Super Cup
Sports in Santo Antão, Cape Verde
Santo Antão North Cup
Santo Antão North Premier Division
Santo Antão North Opening Tournament

References

Sport in Santo Antão, Cape Verde
Football cup competitions in Cape Verde